The Bell Jar is a 1979 American drama film based on Sylvia Plath's 1963 book The Bell Jar. It was directed by Larry Peerce and stars Marilyn Hassett and Julie Harris. The story follows a young woman's summer in New York working for a women's magazine, her return home to New England and her subsequent psychological breakdown within the context of the difficulties of the 1950s, including the Rosenbergs' execution, the disturbing aspects of pop culture and the distraction of predatory college boys.

Plot
Details a young woman's summer in New York working for a Mademoiselle-like magazine, return home to New England, and subsequent breakdown all amidst the horrors of the fifties, from news of the Rosenbergs' execution to sleazy disc jockeys and predatory college boys.

Cast

Marilyn Hassett as Esther Greenwood
Julie Harris as Mrs. Greenwood
Anne Jackson as Dr. Nolan
Barbara Barrie as Jay Cee
Robert Klein as Lenny
Donna Mitchell as Joan
Mary Louise Weller as Doreen
Jameson Parker as Buddy Willard
Thaao Penghlis as Marco
Scott McKay as Mr. Gilling
Meg Mundy as Bea Ramsey
Mia Farrow had been approached for the lead role at one point.

Production
Filmmakers had been trying to adapt the novel for the screen since the early 1970s.

The film was shot in June and July 1978 at Rutgers University in New Jersey, Four Winds Hospital in Katonah, New York and at various locations in New York City. The fashion-show scenes were shot on the seventh-floor terrace of the International Building in New York.

Reception
Janet Maslin of The New York Times was unimpressed, stating that the film's portrayal of Esther was "disastrous [...] because it is the character's imaginative life that leads her to a collapse, and the movie barely even goes skin-deep. The audience isn't given the slightest clue about Esther's quirks, her fears, her peculiarly distorted notion of herself." The film has a "way of spelling things out ad nauseam and still not making them clear." Even where it should have flourished, like in descriptions of Esther's life in New York, "there's no satirical edge to any of this, and no dramatic edge either. It all simply plods along, en route to a nervous collapse that manages to seem perfectly unwarranted by the time it finally occurs."

Variety wrote: "Despite some decent performances, 'The Bell Jar,' based on the late poet Sylvia Plath's autobiographical novel, evokes neither understanding or sympathy for the plight of its heroine ... As played by Marilyn Hassett, who has a cool, Seventeen magazine kind of prettiness, Esther emerges as a selfish, morbid little prig."

Gene Siskel of the Chicago Tribune awarded the film one star out of four and called it "downright laughable, a stormy TV soap opera without that genre's sense of humor. The Bell Jar is more than just a bad movie. It's a bad movie based on a book that has meant much to many, and they will be bitterly disappointed."

Kevin Thomas of the Los Angeles Times wrote that the film "would be ideal material for Ingmar Bergman, or more appropriately, since it is an American work, for the Woody Allen of Interiors. It cries for imagery and stylization—some kind of visual expression of Esther's perceptions and torments, but Peerce's approach is resolutely literal ... Luckily, Marilyn Hassett's Esther is involving and thoroughly convincing—if you're prepared to share her frequent pain at merely being alive."

Judith Martin of The Washington Post wrote the film seemed "especially cruel" to kill Sylvia Plath again "by reputation," by making the heroine of her story "an elitist hysteric."

Jack Kroll of Newsweek wrote that "Marjorie Kellogg's screenplay is reasonably faithful to Plath's novel on the surface, but the movie totally lacks the mythic rhythm and force underneath the book's easy, colloquial style ... Marilyn Hassett looks like Plath with her fine-drawn Puritan beauty, but her clean, strong acting can't overcome the film's stifling conventionality of style."

Penelope Gilliatt of The New Yorker wrote: "A lot that is serious and troubled about insanity has been written in world literature, painted, and also dealt with on film. This picture is merely hysterical."

The Bell Jar holds a 0% rating on Rotten Tomatoes based on eight reviews.

Lawsuit
After the film's release, Boston psychiatrist Dr. Jane V. Anderson claimed that she was portrayed as the Joan character and filed a lawsuit. In the film, Joan attempts to convince Esther to agree to a suicide pact, an incident that is not in the book. Joan is implied to be a lesbian in Plath's novel, although it is never explicitly stated. Anderson's lawyer said that the film portrayal "has grossly damaged her reputation as a practicing psychiatrist and a member of the Harvard Medical School faculty." The lawsuit was settled in 1987 for $150,000.

The British Library holds the archive of poetry, diary entries, correspondence and copies of legal documents relating to the lawsuit, information that also sheds light on the publication of The Bell Jar in the U.S. and the difficulties surrounding the film adaptation.

References

External links

1979 films
1970s psychological drama films
1979 LGBT-related films
American LGBT-related films
American psychological drama films
Embassy Pictures films
1970s English-language films
Films based on American novels
Films directed by Larry Peerce
Films scored by Gerald Fried
Films set in New York City
Films set in the 1950s
Films shot in New Jersey
Films shot in New York City
Sylvia Plath
1979 drama films
1970s American films